Joyce Lomalisa Mutambala (born 18 June 1993) is a Congolese professional footballer who plays as a defender for Tanzanian Premier League club Young Africans.

International career
Lomalisa made his first senior international appearance in a friendly in and against Zambia on 6 November 2015, in which he played the entire match.

Honours
Vita Club
 Linafoot (1): 2015

References

External links
 
 

1993 births
Living people
Democratic Republic of the Congo footballers
Association football defenders
Democratic Republic of the Congo international footballers
2017 Africa Cup of Nations players
21st-century Democratic Republic of the Congo people
Democratic Republic of the Congo A' international footballers
2016 African Nations Championship players
Democratic Republic of the Congo expatriate footballers
Democratic Republic of the Congo expatriate sportspeople in Belgium
Democratic Republic of the Congo expatriate sportspeople in Angola
Expatriate footballers in Angola
Expatriate footballers in Belgium
Royal Excel Mouscron players
G.D. Interclube players
AS Vita Club players